House Party 2: Original Motion Picture Soundtrack is the soundtrack to the 1991 American comedy film House Party 2. It was released on October 15, 1991, through MCA Records after Motown was sold to PolyGram. The soundtrack consisted of a blend of hip hop and contemporary R&B with audio excerpts from the film.

Production was handled by Teddy Riley, Tony! Toni! Toné!, Eric B. & Rakim, Eric "Quicksilver" Johnson, Eric "Vietnam" Sadler, Hank Shocklee, Keith Shocklee, Kevin Dorsey, Laney Stewart, London Jones, Marley Marl and Scratch & Source Productions, Inc. Louil Silas Jr. together with film directors Doug McHenry and George Jackson served as executive producers.

It features contributions from film stars Kid 'n Play, Bell Biv DeVoe, Bubba, Chanté Moore, Eric B. & Rakim, Keith Washington, London Jones, Ralph Tresvant, The Flex, Tony! Toni! Toné!, Wreckx-n-Effect, and the final recording from rapper MC Trouble, who died from an epileptic seizure several months before the soundtrack's release.

Serving as a sequel to 1990's House Party (soundtrack), the album is generally considered an improvement over the first, making it to No. 55 on the Billboard 200 and No. 23 on the Top R&B/Hip-Hop Albums, and featured the charting singles: Kid 'N Play's "Ain't Gonna Hurt Nobody", Tony! Toni! Toné!'s "House Party II (I Don't Know What You Come to Do)" and Ralph Tresvant's "Yo Baby Yo".

Track listing

Personnel

Christopher Reid – performer (tracks: 1, 3, 6, 8, 17, 21), engineering & executive producer (track 6), co-executive producer
Christopher Martin – performer (tracks: 1, 3, 6, 17), co-executive producer
Tony! Toni! Toné! – performers & producers (track 2)
John "Jubu" Smith – producer & arranger (track 2)
Maceo Parker – saxophone (track 2)
John "L.A. Jay" Barnes III – additional programming (track 2), drum overdubs (tracks 13)
Ken Kessie – recording & mixing (tracks: 2, 13)
Louil Silas Jr. – remixing (tracks: 2, 13), backing vocals (track 16), executive producer, A&R
Victor Flores – remixing engineer (tracks: 2, 13)
Wreckx-n-Effect – performers & co-producers (track 4)
Lee "Bubba" Drakeford – lead and backing vocals (tracks: 4, 7)
Teddy Riley – backing vocals, producer & mixing (tracks: 4, 7)
Jean-Marie Horvat – mixing & engineering (tracks: 4, 7)
Martin Lawrence – performer (tracks: 5, 11)
Khadejia Bass – additional vocals (track 6)
Jeffrey Bynes – keyboards (track 6)
Stanley Brown – keyboards (track 6)
Alain Blake – guitar (track 6)
Eric "Quicksilver" Johnson – producer & engineering (track 6)
Yanni Papadopoulos – engineering (track 6)
Tammy Lucas – backing vocals (track 7)
Tisha Campbell – performer (track 8)
Chanté Moore – lead and backing vocals (track 9)
Keith Washington – performer (track 9)
Laney Stewart – backing vocals & producer (track 9)
Tony Haynes – associate producer (track 9)
Thaddis "Kuk" Harrell – vocal arranger & recording (track 9)
Eric G. Sproull – recording (track 9)
Marty Hornberg – engineering assistant & recording (track 9)
Alan Meyerson – mixing (track 9)
London Jones – performer & producer (track 10)
Kevin Dorsey – keyboards & producer (track 10)
Andrew Brown – recording (track 10)
Elliott Peters – mixing (track 10)
Bell Biv DeVoe – performers (track 12)
Hank Shocklee – producer & remixing (track 12)
Eric "Vietnam" Sadler – producer (track 12)
Keith Shocklee – producer (track 12)
Gary G-Wiz – remixing (track 12)
Kurt Yano – remixing engineer (track 12)
Ralph Tresvant – performer (track 13)
Charles Ray "Raphael Saadiq" Wiggins – backing vocals & producer (track 13)
Belma Johnson – backing vocals (track 13)
Rhonda Randall – backing vocals (track 13)
Timothy Christian Riley – producer (track 13)
Kimm James – remixing assistant (track 13)
Full Force – performers (track 14)
Helen Martin – performer (track 14)
William "Rakim" Griffin – performer & producer (track 15)
Eric Barrier – performer & producer (track 15)
Lee Anthony – engineering (track 15)
Mark Harder – engineering (track 15)
LaTasha "MC Trouble" Rogers – performer (track 16)
Kevin "K-Cut" McKenzie – producer (track 16)
Anton Pukshansky – engineering (track 16)
Charles Rogers – executive producer (track 16)
The Flex – performers & co-producers (tracks: 18, 20)
Darren Lighty – keyboard programming (track 18)
Marley Marl – producer (track 18)
George Karras – mixing (track 18)
Georg Stanford Brown – performer (track 19)
Eddy Schreyer – mastering
Doug McHenry – executive producer
George Jackson – executive producer
Miriam Barnes – art direction, artwork
Ilene Weingard – art direction

Chart positions

References

External links

Hip hop soundtracks
1991 soundtrack albums
Comedy film soundtracks
MCA Records soundtracks
House Party (film series)
Albums produced by Eric B.
Contemporary R&B soundtracks
Albums produced by Marley Marl
Albums produced by Teddy Riley
Albums produced by Laney Stewart
Albums produced by Raphael Saadiq